Statherotis ateuches is a species of moth of the family Tortricidae. It is found in New Caledonia in the southwest Pacific Ocean.

The wingspan is about 22 mm. The ground colour of the forewings is cream, preserved as a radial line with brownish marks. The posterior lines are divided by brown suffusions on the veins. In the dorsal area, the colour is brownish cream, marked with brown. The remaining area is brownish. The hindwings are brownish grey.

Etymology 
The species name refers to the simple, unsclerotized uncus and is derived from Greek ateutes (meaning not armed).

References 

Moths described in 2013
Olethreutini